Famous in the Last Century is the twenty-fourth studio album by British rock band Status Quo, released in 2000 to largely negative reviews. According to the band's autobiography, the idea to record it came from manager David Walker, who said they should celebrate the millennium with an album containing twenty of their favourite hits from the past century. "Another bloody covers album!" grumbled Francis Rossi. "We went along with it, as usual, but inside I felt like a fraud... for me it was the worst Quo album there had ever been - or ever will be!"

"We didn't wanna do it," Rossi said, "but it sold. I don't think we'll do another one." However, 2003's Riffs was another covers collection.

Famous in the Last Century reached No.19 on the UK Albums Chart, a better position than the previous Quo album of mainly original material, Under the Influence. Two singles from it – "Mony Mony" and "Old Time Rock and Roll" – were minor hits.

Jeff Rich left the band after recording this album and was replaced by Matt Letley.

A DVD & VHS of the same name and featuring the same songs was filmed at the Shepherd's Bush Empire on 27 March 2000. This performance is mimed but they did a live gig after the album tracks were mimed but no video footage has ever been released. A few live tracks were b sides taken from this performance.

Track listing
 "Famous in the Last Century" (Bown) 1:04
 "Old Time Rock and Roll" (George Jackson, Thomas E. Jones III.) 2:57
 "Way Down" (Martine) 2:51
 "Rave On!" (Petty, William "Billy" Tilghman, Sunny West) 2:51
 "Roll Over Beethoven" (Berry) 3:07
 "When I'm Dead and Gone" (Benny Gallagher, Graham Lyle) 3:11
 "Memphis, Tennessee" (Berry) 2:31
 "Sweet Home Chicago" (R. Johnson) 2:44
 "Crawling from the Wreckage" (Parker) 2:42
 "Good Golly Miss Molly" (Blackwell, Marascalco) 2:05
 "Claudette" (Orbison) 2:01
 "Rock'n Me" (Miller) 2:46
 "Hound Dog" (Leiber, Stoller) 2:19
 "Runaround Sue" (DiMucci, Maresca) 2:29
 "Once Bitten Twice Shy" (Hunter) 3:40
 "Mony Mony" (Bloom, Bo Gentry, James, Ritchie Cordell) 2:58
 "Famous in the Last Century" (Bown) 1:15

Australia bonus tracks
 "Pictures of Matchstick Men" (1999 Version) (Francis Rossi) 3:23 
 "Raining in My Heart" (Special Guest Brian May) (Boudleaux Bryant, Felice Bryant) 3:31 
 "Fun Fun Fun² (With the Beach Boys) (Brian Wilson, Mike Love) 3:59 
 "Whatever You Want² (Andy Bown, Rick Parfitt) 4:16

2006 reissue bonus tracks
 Gerdundula (live) (Manston/James)
 4500 Times (live) (Rossi/Parfitt)
 Rain (live) (Parfitt)

Personnel
Francis Rossi - Vocals & lead guitar
Rick Parfitt - Vocals & guitar
John Edwards - Bass
Andy Bown - Keyboards
Jeff Rich - Drums

Charts

References

1. Rossi, F., Parfitt, R., XS All Areas: The Status Quo autobiography (Sidgwick & Jackson, 2004)

Status Quo (band) albums
2000 albums
Albums produced by Mike Paxman